Web of Mimicry is an independent record label currently based in San Francisco, California founded by Trey Spruance of Mr. Bungle and Secret Chiefs 3.

Roster
ASVA
Brazzaville
Matt Chamberlain
Cleric
Danubius
Dengue Fever
Estradasphere
Faxed Head
Free Salamander Exhibit
Miasma & the Carousel of Headless Horses
Sir Millard Mulch
Secret Chiefs 3
The Stares
The Tuna Helpers
The Youngs

External links

American independent record labels